Same-sex marriage in Nevada has been legally recognized since October 9, 2014, when a federal district court judge issued an injunction against Nevada's enforcement of its same-sex marriage ban, acting on order from the Ninth Circuit Court of Appeals. A unanimous three-judge panel of the Ninth Circuit had ruled two days earlier that the state's ban on same-sex marriage was unconstitutional. Same-sex marriage was previously banned by an amendment to the Constitution of Nevada adopted in 2002. The statutory and constitutional bans were repealed in 2017 and 2020, respectively.

Nevada has recognized domestic partnerships since October 1, 2009, after the Nevada Legislature enacted legislation overriding Governor Jim Gibbons's veto. The state maintains a domestic partnership registry that enables same-sex couples to enjoy most of the same rights as married couples. It allows opposite-sex couples to establish domestic partnerships as well.

Domestic partnerships
Senate Bill 283, legislation creating domestic partnerships in which unmarried couples–both same-sex couples and different-sex couples–would have most of the rights of married couples, was sponsored by openly gay Senator David Parks of Las Vegas in 2009. To attract support, he modified his original draft so that the legislation exempted both private and public employers from having to provide health care benefits to their employees' domestic partners. It passed the Senate on April 21, 2009, on a 12–9 vote, and the Nevada Assembly passed the legislation 26–14 on May 15. On May 25, Governor Jim Gibbons vetoed the legislation. In his veto message he wrote: "I believe because the voters have determined that the rights of marriage should apply only to married couples, only the voters should determine whether those rights should equally apply to domestic partners." On May 30, the Senate overrode Gibbons' veto on a 14–7 vote, and the Assembly overrode the veto the next day on a 28–14 vote, obtaining the two-thirds vote needed to override the veto. The law took effect on October 1, 2009. It allows opposite-sex couples to establish domestic partnerships as well.

The Nevada Domestic Partnership Act (DPA) provides many of the state-level rights, responsibilities, obligations, entitlements and benefits of marriage under the name "domestic partnership". They differ from marriage in lacking a requirement that businesses and governments provide health benefits to the domestic partners of their employees if they do so for the spouses of their married employees. On June 26, 2013, the U.S. Supreme Court ruled in United States v. Windsor, which challenged the Defense of Marriage Act (DOMA) and declared Section 3 of DOMA unconstitutional, reasoning that it violated the protections of the Due Process Clause of the Fifth Amendment, as well as the equal protection guarantee of the Fourteenth Amendment. Because of that ruling, federal government benefits were extended to same-sex couples and their children in states where same-sex marriage is legal. The DPA fails to qualify domestic partnerships as marriages only for the purpose of requiring businesses and governments to provide the health benefits stated above because of that ruling.

Nevada domestic partnerships differ from marriages in that a couple forming a domestic partnership must share a common residence. Domestic partners must be at least 18 years old, the same age required for marriage. While someone who wishes to marry can do so at age 16 with the consent of one parent, no comparable exception is provided for someone who wishes to enter into a domestic partnership before the age of 18.

Some rights provided by a Nevada domestic partnership are:
Hospital visitation, health care decision–making, and information–access rights
Inheritance rights, including the right to administer the estate of an intestate domestic partner, and business succession rights
Rights regarding cemetery plots, disposition of remains, anatomical donations, and ordering of autopsies
A surviving domestic partner may bring a wrongful death action based on the death of the other partner
Community property, domestic violence and testimonial privileges rules apply
Dissolution laws apply (with only a few exceptions)
Domestic partners may sue on behalf of the community
Certain property transfers between partners are not taxed
State veterans' benefits apply
Appointed and elected officials' domestic partners are subject to the same laws and regulations that apply to officials' spouses
Employment benefits, including sick leave to care for a domestic partner; wages and benefits when a domestic partner is injured, and to unpaid wages upon the death of a domestic partner; unemployment and disability insurance benefits; workers' compensation coverage
Insurance rights, including rights under group policies, policy rights after the death of a domestic partner, conversion rights and continuing coverage rights
Rights related to adoption, child custody and child support

Same-sex marriage

Statute
Between 1975 and 2017, Nevada's marriage statute (NRS § 122.020) stated that "a male and a female person...may be joined in marriage".

On February 21, 2017, a bill to make the marriage statute gender-neutral was introduced to the Nevada Assembly by Representative Ellen Spiegel of Henderson. The legislation passed the Assembly on April 17 in a 28–10 vote, and passed the Senate on May 17 in a 20–1 vote. It was signed into law by Governor Brian Sandoval on May 26 and took effect on July 1, 2017. Nevada statutes now read:

Constitutional amendments
Nevada voters approved Question 2, an amendment to the Constitution of Nevada that banned same-sex marriage, by 69.6% in 2000 and 67.1% in 2002. Richard Ziser, a real estate investor, headed the Coalition for the Protection of Marriage, which led the successful campaign that amended the State Constitution to define marriage as a union between "one man and one woman."

In 2013, the Nevada Legislature began work on legislation to repeal the constitutional ban and substitute in its place a gender-neutral definition of marriage. The Senate approved such legislation on April 22 on a 12–9 vote, and the Nevada Assembly passed the resolution on May 23 by a 27–14 vote. It would have required approval by the next legislative session in 2015 and by voters in the 2016 election to take effect. However, as Republicans took control of the Senate following the 2014 elections, no second vote was held.

On February 1, 2017, after the Democratic Party took control of the Senate following the 2016 elections, identical legislation (known as AJR2) was introduced to repeal the now-defunct ban on same-sex marriage in the Constitution. The resolution passed the Assembly on March 9, 2017, in a 27–14 vote. The Senate amended it to include a religious exemption, after which it passed the bill on May 1 in a 19–2 vote, and the Assembly approved the Senate's amendment on May 2. The resolution returned to the Nevada Legislature in February 2019. It was approved by the Assembly on March 29, 2019, in a 38–2 vote and by the Senate on May 23 in a 19–2 vote. The initiative was then placed on the November 2020 ballot for approval by voters. As Question 2, it was approved with 62% of the vote. The constitutional amendment went into force on November 24, 2020. Section 21 of Article 1 of the Nevada Constitution now reads:

Lawsuits

Sevcik v. Sandoval

On April 10, 2012, Lambda Legal filed suit in the U.S. District Court for the District of Nevada. In the case of Sevcik v. Sandoval, it argued that "No legitimate ... interest exists to exclude same-sex couples from the historic and highly venerated institution of marriage, especially where the State already grants lesbians and gay men access to almost all substantive spousal rights and responsibilities through registered domestic partnership." The case raised equal protection claims but did not assert a fundamental right to marry. On November 29, 2012, Judge Robert C. Jones ruled against the plaintiffs, holding that "the maintenance of the traditional institution of civil marriage as between one man and one woman is a legitimate state interest". The decision was appealed to the Ninth Circuit Court of Appeals.

In February 2014, the state withdrew its brief defending Nevada's ban on same-sex marriage. Governor Brian Sandoval stated: "It has become clear that this case is no longer defensible in court". On October 7, 2014, the Ninth Circuit Court of Appeals reversed the decision of the federal district court and remanded it back to the district court, ordering it to issue an injunction to bar enforcement of Nevada's amendment banning same-sex marriage. The court held that Nevada's ban on same-sex marriage constituted a violation of same-sex couples' Fourteenth Amendment right to equal protection. The court also applied heightened scrutiny in concluding that Nevada's ban constituted discrimination on the basis of sexual orientation. On October 9, Judge James C. Mahan issued the injunction and same-sex couples began obtaining marriage licenses.

Representative Lucy Flores welcomed the court ruling, saying, "Allowing people to marry who they love is the right thing to do." Senator Michael Roberson said that "[t]he state of Nevada should not discriminate against anyone", while Senator Justin Jones said, "This decision wasn't about being a Democrat or a Republican, but about giving those who love one another, regardless of gender, the rights we all deserve." Secretary of State Ross Miller welcomed the court ruling. The first same-sex couple to receive a marriage license were Kristy Best and Wednesday Smith at around 3 p.m. on Thursday, October 9 in Carson City. Theo Small and Antioco Carillo were the first couple to be issued a license in Las Vegas shortly after 5 p.m. on October 9, followed a few minutes later by State Senator Kelvin Atkinson and his partner Sherwood Howard.

LaFrance v. Cline
The Nevada Supreme Court ruled unanimously in LaFrance v. Cline on December 23, 2020, that the U.S. Supreme Court's decision in Obergefell v. Hodges obliges the state to recognize same-sex marriages legally performed in other jurisdictions before 2014. Mary Elizabeth LaFrance and Gail Cline had a civil union ceremony in Vermont in 2000 and legally wed in Canada in 2003, but their marriage was not recognized in Nevada at the time. In 2014, they divorced and filed for judicial dissolution. The trial court had to decide what property and assets were part of the "community" for purposes of division of assets. District Court Judge Mathew Harter concluded that pursuant to Obergefell he should find that their "community" came into effect when the couple entered into their civil union in 2000, and divided property accordingly. LaFrance appealed, contending that their marital community, for purposes of Nevada law, did not come into effect until the Sevcik decision in 2014. The state Supreme Court decided that a Vermont civil union could be recognized for these purposes solely if the couple had registered it as a Nevada domestic partnership, which LaFrance and Cline did not do. The court concluded that their marital community was formed in 2003 in Canada. Even though it was not recognized in Nevada at the time, the court found that it must be retroactively recognized pursuant to Obergefell.

Marriages in the Republic of Molossia
Same-sex marriage has been legal in the Republic of Molossia, an unrecognized micronation near Dayton, since December 2002. The government issued a proclamation effective from December 29, 2002, that: "Discrimination against any individual in any manner on the grounds of sexual orientation is absolutely prohibited. This prohibition extends to the Government of the Republic of Molossia, its agencies, any private organization or agency (to include religious institutions), and any and all private citizens. This prohibition includes but is not limited to: discrimination as regards marriage (Partnering), inheritance, jobs, justice and the redress of wrongs, education, and spiritual sustenance. Verbal discrimination, i.e. disparaging remarks, is equally forbidden. Furthermore, no distinction will be made between homosexual relationships and heterosexual relationships. Both will be treated equally by the Government of the Republic of Molossia, its agencies, any private organization or agency (to include religious institutions), and any and all private citizens."

Statistics
Clark County issued its 10,000th same-sex marriage license on January 20, 2017. The number of same-sex marriages performed in Clark County was 957 in 2014, followed by 4,055 in 2015, 4,778 in 2016, 4,418 in 2017, 4,269 in 2018, 4,233 in 2019, 3,469 in 2020, and 4,563 in 2021. Often referred to as the "Marriage Capital of the World", Las Vegas (and adjacent communities in Clark County) has one of the highest marriage rates in the U.S., attracting many couples from overseas and other states. In 2019, 420 same-sex spouses were from Mexico, 350 from England, 326 from China, 213 from the Philippines, 147 from Canada, 143 from Germany, 115 from France, 90 from Australia and 87 from Brazil, as well as several dozen from Israel, Spain, Cuba, Vietnam, Italy, Venezuela, Scotland, El Salvador and Thailand.

Native American nations
The Law and Order Code of the Fort McDermitt Paiute and Shoshone Tribe states that marriage is governed by state law rather than tribal law. As such, same-sex marriage is legal in the reservation of the tribe. The Law and Order Code of the Fallon Paiute-Shoshone Tribe generally refers to married spouses as "husband and wife" but states that marriages entered into outside the tribe's jurisdiction are valid if they are valid in the jurisdiction where they were entered into. Similar language is found in the codes of the Washoe Tribe of Nevada and California, and the Yomba Shoshone Tribe. The laws of the Ely Shoshone Tribe do not allow for the solemnization of same-sex marriages. Its Tribal Code states that "a male and a female person, at least 18 years of age, not nearer of kin than second cousins or cousins of the half blood, and not having a husband or wife living, may be joined in marriage."

Marriages between two-spirit people and men or women have been historically performed among these tribes. They performed women's activities but did not always wear women's clothing. Some of them married men, others married women, while others remained unmarried. It was considered inappropriate, however, for two  to form a relationship. The two-spirit status thus allowed for marriages between two biological males to be performed in these tribes.

Public opinion
{| class="wikitable"
|+style="font-size:100%" | Public opinion for same-sex marriage in Nevada
|-
! style="width:190px;"| Poll source
! style="width:200px;"| Date(s)administered
! class=small | Samplesize
! Margin oferror
! style="width:100px;"| % support
! style="width:100px;"| % opposition
! style="width:40px;"| % no opinion
|-
| Public Religion Research Institute
| align=center| March 8–November 9, 2021
| align=center| ?
| align=center| ?
|  align=center| 71%
| align=center| 22%
| align=center| 7%
|-
| Public Religion Research Institute
| align=center| January 7–December 20, 2020
| align=center| 492 random telephoneinterviewees
| align=center| ?
|  align=center| 80%
| align=center| 16%
| align=center| 4%
|-
| Public Religion Research Institute
| align=center| April 5–December 23, 2017
| align=center| 832 random telephoneinterviewees
| align=center| ?
|  align=center| 70%
| align=center| 23%
| align=center| 7%
|-
| American Values Atlas/Public Religion Research Institute
| align=center| May 18, 2016–January 10, 2017
| align=center| 977 random telephoneinterviewees
| align=center| ?
|  align=center| 67%
| align=center| 25%
| align=center| 8%
|-
| American Values Atlas/Public Religion Research Institute
| align=center| April 29, 2015–January 7, 2016
| align=center| 690 random telephoneinterviewees
| align=center| ?
|  align=center| 57%
| align=center| 35%
| align=center| 8%
|-
| New York Times/CBS News/YouGov
| align=center| September 20 – October 1, 2014
| align=center| 1,502 likely voters
| align=center| ± 3.4%
|  align=center| 55%
| align=center| 31%
| align=center| 13%
|-
| Moore Information
| align=center| September 27–29, 2013
| align=center| 500 likely voters
| align=center| ?
|  align=center| 57%
| align=center| 36%
| align=center| 7%
|-
| Public Opinion Strategies
| align=center| 2013
| align=center| 500 likely voters
| align=center| ?
|  align=center| 54%
| align=center| 42%
| align=center| 4%
|-
| Public Policy Polling
| align=center| August 23–26, 2012
| align=center| 831 likely voters
| align=center| ± 3.4%
|  align=center| 47%
| align=center| 43%
| align=center| 11%
|-
| Public Policy Polling
| align=center| July 28–31, 2011
| align=center| 601 Nevada voters
| align=center| ± 4%
|  align=center| 45%
| align=center| 44%
| align=center| 11%
|-

See also

 LGBT rights in Nevada
 Same-sex marriage in the United States

Notes

References

External links
Sevcik v. Sandoval, Ninth Circuit Court of Appeals, October 7, 2014

Nevada law
LGBT in Nevada
Nevada
2014 in LGBT history
2014 in Nevada